The 2015 LSU Tigers football team represented Louisiana State University in the 2015 NCAA Division I FBS football season. They played their home games at Tiger Stadium, in Baton Rouge, Louisiana, and competed in the Western Division of the Southeastern Conference (SEC). They were led by 11th-year head coach Les Miles. They finished the season 9–3, 5–3 in SEC play to finish in a tie for third place in the Western Division. They were invited to the Texas Bowl where they defeated Texas Tech.

Previous season and offseason
The 2014 LSU Tigers football team finished the season 8–5 (4–4 in SEC) with a loss to Notre Dame in the Music City Bowl, 31–28. The Tigers won all four non-conference games including the Big-Ten runner-up Wisconsin Badgers, and four SEC games against Florida, Kentucky, Ole Miss, and Texas A&M. LSU suffered its first loss of the season at home against the Mississippi State Bulldogs, the first loss to the Bulldogs since 1999 and first loss to the Bulldogs at home since 1991.

The previous season was one of the worst for LSU under Les Miles, matching the record of the 2008 LSU Tigers football team. The team did manage to sign the consensus #2 recruiting class in the country, including top rated recruits Leonard Fournette, Malachi Dupre, and Brandon Harris, all who made contributions during the season. After the bowl game, Defensive coordinator John Chavis announced he was leaving LSU for the same position at Texas A&M. LSU hired former Alabama defensive coordinator Kevin Steele to fill the position, and subsequently hired former Ole Miss head coach Ed Orgeron to coach the defensive line. Former defensive line coach and ace recruiter Brick Haley departed for the same position at Texas in February.

LSU lost only three underclassmen to the NFL in the offseason: linebacker Kwon Alexander, cornerback Jalen Collins and defensive end Danielle Hunter; this was a large decrease compared to losing 11 underclassmen in 2012 and 7 in 2013. On January 16 Les Miles held a press conference announcing that six underclassmen starters would return, including leading receiver Travin Dural and star defensive back Jalen Mills, as well as offensive linemen Vadal Alexander and Jerald Hawkins, tight end Dillon Gordon, and linebacker Lamar Louis.

For the third consecutive season, LSU signed a top-ten recruiting class consisting of 25 signees, highlighted by top-rated recruits Kevin Toliver II, Arden Key, Tyron Johnson, and Donte Jackson. While not as acclaimed as the previous season's consensus #2 ranked class, the class was ranked #10 by ESPN, #8 by rivals.com, and #5 by 24/7 sports.

Players drafted

Reference:

Class of 2015 signees

Coaching staff

Depth chart
The official opening day depth chart was released on August 31, 2015.Schedule
LSU announced their 2015 football schedule on October 14, 2014. The 2015 schedule consists of 7 home games and 5 away games in the regular season. The Tigers will host SEC foes Arkansas, Auburn, Florida, and Texas A&M, and will travel to Alabama, Mississippi State, Ole Miss, and South Carolina. The Tigers planned to open the 2015 season against the McNeese State Cowboys at home on September 5, however, several lightning delays caused the game to be canceled. As a result, LSU will play a schedule of 11 regular season games for 2015. The Tigers officially opened their season on the road against conference and division rival Mississippi State on September 12. The other non-conference games on LSU's schedule are against Eastern Michigan, Syracuse, and Western Kentucky. This season will consist of the first meeting against the Syracuse Orange since the 1989 Hall of Fame Bowl where the Orange defeated the Tigers 23–10. Because of massive flooding to the Columbia, South Carolina area, both schools agreed to play the October 10th matchup at Tiger Stadium, while still treating it as a home game for South Carolina.

The game between LSU and McNeese State was canceled due to inclement weather.  The game was delayed due to lightning after 5 minutes of play during which each team held the ball for one drive and no one scored. Both schools' athletic directors decided not to reschedule the game, thus declaring it a "no contest". LSU did agree to pay McNeese State its promised fee of $500,000.
The game between LSU and South Carolina was originally scheduled to take place in Columbia, South Carolina.  However, in light of massive flooding in Columbia earlier in the week, the game was moved to Baton Rouge.Schedule Source:'''

Rankings

Season summary

at Mississippi State

Auburn

at Syracuse

Eastern Michigan

South Carolina

Florida

Western Kentucky

References

LSU
LSU Tigers football seasons
Texas Bowl champion seasons
LSU Tigers football